The 1959 New Zealand rugby league tour of Australia was the nineteenth tour of by New Zealand's national rugby league team, and the fourteen tour to visit Australia. The team lost the first two Test Matches of a three match series, but won every other match.

Touring squad
The following players were listed in the program, Rugby League News,  for the match against New South Wales.

Matches

1st Test

2nd Test

3rd Test

Sources

References

New Zealand national rugby league team tours
Rugby league tour
New Zealand rugby league tour